Navagraham is a 1970 Indian Tamil-language comedy drama film written and directed by K. Balachander. The film stars Nagesh, Srikanth, R. Muthuraman and Lakshmi, with Ragini, Sivakumar, Rama Prabha, Y. G. Mahendran (his film debut), V. Gopalakrishnan and G. Sakunthala in supporting roles. It was released on 3 September 1970.

Plot 
Nine people living as a joint family in a house has amongst them varied characters with weird idiosyncrasies. A thief and orphan, Baalu, enters the house and uses this to his advantage playing one family member against another. He then realizes that he is the son of Somu, the patriarch of the house, and then sets to reunite the family only to the thrown out by all of them in the end.

Cast 
 Nagesh as Baalu
 Sundarrajan as Somu
 Muthuraman as Siva
 V. Gopalakrishnan as Mali
 I. S. R as Mani
 Mahendran as Anumanthu
 Sivakumar as Vatsala's lover
 Srikanth as Eeswaran
 Ragini as Akilaandam
 Rama Prabha as Amirtham
 G. Sakunthala as Saraswathi
 Lakshmi as Vatsala

Production 
Navagraham marked Y. G. Mahendran's acting debut in cinema. Manorama was supposed to play the love interest of Nagesh but was dropped at the latter's insistence causing a permanent rift between them.

Soundtrack 
The soundtrack was composed by V. Kumar and lyrics were written by Vaali.

References

External links 
 

1970 comedy-drama films
1970 films
1970s Tamil-language films
Films directed by K. Balachander
Films scored by V. Kumar
Films with screenplays by K. Balachander
Indian black-and-white films
Indian comedy-drama films